Santonio may refer to:

Santonio Beard, American football player
Santonio Holmes, American football player
Santonio Thomas, American football player
 A nickname for San Antonio, Texas